Ted Dent (born November 5, 1969) is a Canadian former professional ice hockey player and the current Head Coach of the Flint Firebirds of the Ontario Hockey League. He was an American Hockey League head coach for the Rockford IceHogs.

Prior to turning professional, Dent attended St. Lawrence University where he played four seasons with the St. Lawrence Saints men's ice hockey team.

On April 25, 2017, the Blackhawks announced that they have relieved Dent of his duties as the head coach of the IceHogs. During his six seasons with the team, he posted a record of 221-179-33-21.

References

External links

1969 births
Arizona Coyotes scouts
Canadian ice hockey centres
Canadian ice hockey coaches
Charlotte Checkers (1993–2010) players
Johnstown Chiefs players
Living people
Philadelphia Bulldogs players
St. Lawrence Saints men's ice hockey players
Ice hockey people from Toronto
Toledo Storm players
Washington Capitals coaches
Wichita Thunder players